Tiny Town is an unincorporated community located in Todd County, Kentucky, United States. It was also known as Breeze Inn and Grays Station.

References

Unincorporated communities in Todd County, Kentucky
Unincorporated communities in Kentucky